Itaria may refer to :

 Itaria State, a former princely state on Saurashtra in Gujarat, western India
 Japanese for Italia ('Italy'),
 as in the fictional character Itaria Veneziāno, one of three Hetalia: Axis Powers protagonists